Robert Kerketta S.D.B. (22 October 1932 – 22 December 2018) was an Indian Roman Catholic bishop.

Biography 
Keretta was born in India and was ordained to the priesthood in 1963. He served as bishop of the Roman Catholic Diocese of Dibrugarh, India, from 1970 to 1980 and as bishop of the Roman Catholic Diocese of Tezpur, India, from 1980 to 2007.

Notes

1932 births
2018 deaths
21st-century Roman Catholic bishops in India
Salesian bishops
20th-century Roman Catholic bishops in India